The Taiwan consensus is a Taiwanese political term, which was coined in August 2011 by Democratic Progressive Party (DPP) chair Tsai Ing-wen, and is intended to replace the "1992 consensus", which was the basis of DPP's negotiations between Taiwan and the mainland China until now.

History 
The term appeared first in August 2011, when DPP chair Tsai Ing-wen disclosed the point "National Security Strategy and the development of cross-strait trade" at the "ten years platform". Through the concept of Taiwan consensus, Tsai Ing-wen directly competes with President Ma Ying-jeou's political views for the 2012 Republic of China presidential election.

Meaning 
Tsai believes that the 1992 consensus is solely based on the One-China policy and the desire to preserve it. The DPP further states, that a "consensus" among the Taiwanese people about the "1992 consensus" does not exist. The DPP hopes to get a "Taiwan Consensus" (a consensus amongst the people) to displace the 1992 consensus, which would be ratified by legislation and a referendum. This new consensus should then form the basis for negotiations with the PRC.

Tsai states further that the Taiwan consensus "is not an ordinary problem to be decided by majority", "is not an ordinary legislation or public issue" and "not even a purely domestic problem." Because Taiwan is domestically not united with China and has no consensus on the direction towards China, the Taiwanese government has no basis for negotiations with China. She hopes, that through democratic processes and the Legislative Yuan "with all different political views [we] can find common ground", "[because] that is the true spirit of the Taiwan consensus".

See also 

 Cross-Strait relations
 One Country on Each Side
 1992 consensus

References

External links 
 紐約說文解字 蔡英文：台灣共識3不3有, 聯合新聞網, 2011-09-17

Cross-Strait relations
Democratic Progressive Party
2011 in Taiwan
2011 introductions